Tauragės futbolo klubas, commonly known as FK Tauras or simply Tauras, is a Lithuanian professional football club based in Tauragė. The club competes in the II Lyga, the third tier of Lithuanian football.

History
The club was founded 1922 in the Lithuanian city Tauragė.

Name
During its history the club has changed its name several times:
1922 – Tauras
1947 – Žalgiris
1957 – Maistas
1959 – Maisto Sporto Klubas (MSK)
1962 – Tauras
1990 – Elektronas
1992 – Tauras-Karšuva
1995 – Tauras
2005 – Tauras ERRA
2008 – Tauras

European record

UEFA Europa League:

Achievements
Lithuanian SSR championship: 1
 1987

Former players

  Alessandro Mascia

Managers
 Jonas Stažys (1987)
 Šenderis Giršovičius (1987–88)
 Edvardas Malkevičius (2009)
 Aleksandr Brazevich (2009)
 Jurijus Popkovas (2009)
 Gediminas Jarmalavičius (Jan 1, 2011–11)
 Giovanni Scanu (2012)
 Aleksandr Brazevich (March 6, 2013 – July 25, 2013)
 Ramazan Silin (August 4, 2013 – September 5, 2013)
 Gediminas Jarmalavičius (September 5, 2013–?)
 Jonas Stažys (?-?)

 
Association football clubs established in 1922
1922 establishments in Lithuania
Football clubs in Lithuania
Tauragė